The Piper PA-31T Cheyenne is a turboprop development of the earlier PA-31P Pressurized Navajo.

Development
Originally, the aircraft was an upgraded version of the Pressurized Navajo equipped with two Pratt & Whitney Canada PT6A-28 turboprop engines. Later, the aircraft was further refined and developed, including aerodynamic improvements and fuselage extensions. The PA-31T led to the development of the PA-42 Cheyenne III and IV.

Operators

Military operators 

Mauritanian Air Force
 
United States Department of Defense.

Variants
PA-31T Cheyenne Initial production version, powered by two 620-shp (462-kW) Pratt & Whitney Canada PT6A-28 turboprop engines.

PA-31T-1 Original designation of the PT-31T Cheyenne I. Powered by 500-shp (373-kW) Pratt & Whitney Canada PT6A-II turboprop engines.
PA-31T Cheyenne II Improved version, renamed version of original powered by two 620-shp (462-kW) Pratt & Whitney Canada PT6A-28 turboprop engines.
PA-31T2 Cheyenne IIXL Stretched version, powered by two 750-shp (559-kW) Pratt & Whitney  Canada PT6A-135 turboprop engines.

Specifications

See also

References

External links

 The Piper PA-31T Cheyenne history from Airliners.net

Cheyenne
1970s United States civil utility aircraft
Low-wing aircraft
Aircraft first flown in 1969
Twin-turboprop tractor aircraft